Anneke Feinya Agustin (born 11 August 1991) is a former badminton player from Indonesia specializing in doubles. She had shown her achievements in badminton together with Nitya Krishinda Maheswari. The duo seize the women's doubles gold medal at the 2011 Southeast Asian Games. She decided to stop from national training camp since 2014 due to injury.

Achievements

Southeast Asian Games 
Women's doubles

BWF World Junior Championships 
Girls' doubles

BWF Grand Prix (3 titles) 
The BWF Grand Prix had two levels, the Grand Prix and Grand Prix Gold. It was a series of badminton tournaments sanctioned by the Badminton World Federation (BWF) and played between 2007 and 2017.

Women's doubles

 BWF Grand Prix Gold tournament
 BWF Grand Prix tournament

References

External links 
 

1991 births
Living people
Sportspeople from Special Region of Yogyakarta
Indonesian female badminton players
Competitors at the 2011 Southeast Asian Games
Southeast Asian Games gold medalists for Indonesia
Southeast Asian Games silver medalists for Indonesia
Southeast Asian Games medalists in badminton
21st-century Indonesian women